"This Is the Way" is a dance-pop song written by Eliot Kennedy, Cary Baylis and Michael Ward for Australian singer Dannii Minogue's second album, Get into You (1993). The song was released as the album's fourth single in September 1993. It peaked at number 27 on the UK Singles Chart and number 45 in Australia.

Critical reception
Alan Jones from Music Week wrote, "Strong bass and weedy synth strings underpin a muscular pop/dance confection that draws one of Minogue's meatier vocals." Tom Doyle from Smash Hits gave the song three out of five, describing it as "the sort of perky pop records that made Kylie famous. It's your typical hands-in-the-air house stuff in which Dannii goes "searching for love" before discovering her "true love story". You get the picture."

Music video
The song's aaccompanying music video, filmed in New Jersey, serves as a sequel to that of Minogue's previous hit, "This Is It". In it, Minogue is portrayed as a woman with a lucrative career, who is doing very well - until in a coffee shop, she sees a couple being romantic towards one another, which causes her to reminisce about her time with her boyfriend (Julian McMahon). Upon returning to work, she bumps into a similarly high-career man, causing her to drop her papers. He picks them up for her, and is amazed upon seeing her. They go out for a coffee date the next day, but when he goes too far in getting close to her, she snaps and throws coffee over him. She goes to her apartment and breaks down. When she sees a photo of her and McMahon kissing, she drastically changes out of her work outfit and packs for a trip to McMahon's Turnpike farmhouse. However, while she is packing for her trip, her coffee date from earlier knocks on the door, intending to apologise for his mistake. But Minogue is intent on rekindling her relationship with McMahon and sneaks out through the back door and through the fire escape and makes her way into her car, in which she drives off. However, as she drives, she looks to see that the man is driving in the car behind her, but she manages to evade him by driving through a tollbooth and through a highway. At Turnpike, her car breaks down and she is forced to buy a bike to ride the rest of the way to McMahon's farmhouse.

While all this is happening, McMahon is shown doing various things: painting a still life portrait, chopping wood from trees, pouring water over himself and running with his dog, all while secretly thinking about his time with Minogue. Towards the end, he sees Minogue's bike riding along while he is in his backyard. As she knocks on his door, he answers, and both look at each other tense, but he smiles and Minogue gives a relieved look. The video ends just as the couple reunite amicably.

Track listings
 Australian CD and cassette single; UK CD1 (D11584; C11584; MCSTD1935)
 "This Is the Way" (7-inch edit)
 "This Is the Way" (12-inch version)
 "This Is the Way" (The Cool 7-inch)
 "This Is the Way" (Dub version)

 UK CD2 (MCSXD1935)
 "This Is the Way" (7-inch edit)
 "No Secret"
 "This Is the Way" (5 Boys mix)
 "This Is the Way" (Funk mix)

Charts

References

1993 singles
1993 songs
Dannii Minogue songs
Dance-pop songs
MCA Records singles
Mushroom Records singles
Song recordings produced by Eliot Kennedy
Songs written by Eliot Kennedy
Songs written by Michael Ward (musician)